Allahabad (also Romanized as Allāhābād; also known as Mobārakābād) is a village in Ashiyan Rural District, in the Central District of Lenjan County, Isfahan Province, Iran. At the 2006 census, its population was 435, in 109 families.

References 

Populated places in Lenjan County